James Patrick Ryan (born 6 September 1942) is a Welsh footballer who played as a centre forward in the Football League.

References

1942 births
Living people
Welsh footballers
Wales under-23 international footballers
People from Prestatyn
Sportspeople from Denbighshire
Association football forwards
Charlton Athletic F.C. players
Dulwich Hamlet F.C. players
Exeter City F.C. players
Hastings United F.C. (1948) players
Millwall F.C. players
English Football League players
Dover F.C. players